Ottiglio is a comune (municipality) in the Province of Alessandria in the Italian region Piedmont, located about  east of Turin and about  northwest of Alessandria.

Ottiglio borders the following municipalities: Casorzo, Cella Monte, Cereseto, Frassinello Monferrato, Grazzano Badoglio, Moncalvo, Olivola, and Sala Monferrato.

The actor Ernest Borgnine became honorary citizen in 2006, because his father Camillo Borgnino born in Ottiglio.

References

Cities and towns in Piedmont